Feleipe Franks (born December 22, 1997) is an American football tight end for the Atlanta Falcons of the National Football League (NFL). He played his first two years of college football at Florida and transferred to Arkansas for his final season. Franks joined the Falcons as an undrafted free agent in 2021.

Early years
Franks attended Wakulla High School in Crawfordville, Florida. During his high school career he passed for 6,867 yards and 81 touchdowns. Franks was regarded as a four-star recruit by the major recruiting services, and was rated as the fifth-highest ranked pro-style quarterback and 54th-highest ranked prospect overall in the 247Sports Composite. He originally committed to Louisiana State University (LSU) to play college football on June 1, 2014, but switched his commitment to the University of Florida on November 29, 2015.

College career

Florida

2016–2017 

Franks redshirted his first year at Florida in 2016. As a redshirt freshman in 2017, he was named the starting quarterback heading into Florida's season opener against Michigan, beating out 2016 starter Luke Del Rio and incoming Notre Dame transfer Malik Zaire. Franks struggled in the game against Michigan, and was benched in favor of Zaire in the second half after completing 5 of 9 passes for 75 yards. The Gators went on to lose 33–17. In the Gators' next game on September 16, 2017, against Tennessee, Franks started the game and threw for 212 yards, including the game-winning 63-yard Hail Mary pass to receiver Tyrie Cleveland. Florida won the game 26–20 for Franks' first career win. After a 3–1 start, the Gators' season derailed, as they lost six of their final seven games to finish with a disappointing 4–7 record and the school's second losing season since 1979. Franks led the team in passing with 1,438 yards, nine touchdowns and eight interceptions.

2018 
As a redshirt sophomore in 2018, Franks was again named the starting quarterback ahead of the season's opening game, fighting off competition from fellow redshirt sophomore Kyle Trask and true freshman Emory Jones. He threw for 219 yards and five touchdowns in Florida's 53–6 opening win over Charleston Southern. He set a career high with 284 passing yards to go along with two touchdowns and an interception in an October 13 win over Vanderbilt. Franks helped the Gators to a dramatic turnaround compared with the 2017 season, as they finished with a 10–3 record and a victory over Michigan in the Peach Bowl, ending the season at seventh in the final polls. Franks posted 2,457 passing yards, 24 passing touchdowns, six interceptions, and seven rushing touchdowns on the year. His 31 total touchdowns was tied for third in the Southeastern Conference.

2019 
In Florida's 2019 opener, Franks completed 17 of 27 passes for 254 yards, two touchdowns, two interceptions, and a rushing touchdown in a 24–20 win over rival Miami. In the Gators' third game of the season against Kentucky, Franks was carted off the field with an apparent leg injury late in the third quarter. Florida head coach Dan Mullen said after the game that team doctors believed Franks suffered a broken ankle and would likely miss the remainder of the season. On December 1, 2019, Franks announced he would be leaving the Florida program.

Arkansas

2020
On January 20, 2020, Franks announced he would be transferring to Arkansas. On September 16, 2020, he was named one of four team captains for the season, and was shortly thereafter named the starting quarterback for the Razorbacks' season opener against Georgia. On October 3, 2020, Franks led the Razorbacks in a 21–14 win against No. 16 Mississippi State, breaking Arkansas' 20-game SEC losing streak as well as their 15-game losing streak against ranked opponents.

Baseball
On June 5, 2019, the Boston Red Sox of MLB drafted Franks with the 947th overall pick (in the 31st round) of the 2019 MLB draft. Franks, who played baseball in high school but not at Florida, indicated that he would continue his football career.

Statistics

Professional career

Atlanta Falcons
On May 3, 2021, Franks signed with the Atlanta Falcons as an undrafted free agent. He was named the third-string quarterback behind incumbent starter Matt Ryan and second-string backup Josh Rosen.

Franks made his NFL debut in Week 11 during the Falcons' final drive against the New England Patriots. His first pass was intercepted by safety Adrian Phillips, concluding the 25–0 shutout loss. The turnover marked the fourth consecutive Falcons drive to end with an interception, following two thrown by Ryan and one returned for a touchdown from Rosen.

In June 2022, Franks began taking reps at the tight end position, with the Falcons announcing they were planning to use him in a hybrid role.

Personal life
Franks' older brother, Jordan, is a tight end for the Kansas City Chiefs.

References

External links
Atlanta Falcons bio
Arkansas Razorbacks bio
Florida Gators bio

Living people
1997 births
People from Crawfordville, Florida
Players of American football from Florida
Wakulla High School alumni
American football quarterbacks
Florida Gators football players
Arkansas Razorbacks football players
Atlanta Falcons players